Patient is the name of a 192-page memoir by musician Ben Watt. It was published May 1, 1997 by Penguin Books. The book dealt largely with Watt's experience with a rare disease, Churg–Strauss syndrome, and his recovery.

The book was listed as a New York Times Notable Book of the Year, a Sunday Times Book Of The Year chosen by William Boyd, and Village Voice Literary Supplement Favorite Book of the Year, and was also a finalist for the Esquire-Waterstones Best Non-Fiction Award in the UK.

References

External links

1997 non-fiction books
British memoirs
Books about diseases